Chrysothyridia triangulifera is a moth in the family Crambidae. It was described by Eugene G. Munroe in 1967. It is found on Luzon in the Philippines.

References

Moths described in 1967
Spilomelinae